The following is a list of Buffalo Bulls men's basketball head coaches. The Bulls have had 14 coaches in their 106-season history.

Buffalo's current head coach is Jim Whitesell. He was hired in April 2019 to replace Nate Oats, who left to become the head coach at Alabama.

References

Buffalo

Buffalo Bulls men's basketball coaches